Broa de Avintes is the farmhouse bread of Avintes, also known as Boroa of Avintes (particularly by the inhabitants of Avintes, parish of Vila Nova de Gaia -  also called the "land of bread") is a type of bread with a long tradition in Portugal which is widely consumed in the northern part of the country.

Etymology

The name "broa" or "boroa" likely comes from Germanic *brauda-, specifically Suebian. This type of bread existed in Gallaecia at least since Suebian times. Prior to the addition of corn to the mixture, the main ingredients of broa were rye and malt. After corn was introduced in Europe from the Americas, "broa" became widely associated with "corn-bread". 
Apart from the similarity of the Portuguese and German words Broa and Brot, there is a strong resemblance between this very traditional Northern Portuguese bread and the German Roggenbrot (rye bread).
Some suggest the name 'Broa' could derive instead from the Celtic word *broga- 'limit, field'.

Definition and production 
It is a dark brown, very dense bread with a distinctive and intense flavour, bittersweet, made with  corn and rye flours. It has a particularly slow manufacturing process:  it is baked for about five to six hours in the oven. Once cooked, it is sprinkled with flour. The bread generally has the shape of a bell tower.

Recent history 
Nowadays, the bread of Avintes is also produced outside its original parish with industrial source materials  The old mills of Avintes no longer have economic relevance. However, for the sake of tradition, the people of Avintes have maintained its crafty production, which is well appreciated by consumers who increasingly seek genuinely traditional products.

The making and eating 
Connected to its production are  many so-called "secrets" which, real or not, lay in the certitudes and knowledge gained from experience of many generations of Avintes' bakers as well as the judicious choice of materials used. There were also some superstitions related to its mixing and baking, involving prayers and blessings, as indeed in the rest of Portugal when making bread in the old fashioned ways.

The "brôa" can also be served fried - for example, during Christmas  as part of typical dishes in some of the northerners'homes. It is also used as the basis for multiple meal starters, for example with presunto (cured ham) and with traditional Portuguese "caldo-verde" or "green broth".

Every year, since 1988, the village of Avintes hosts their "brôa" bread festival during the last week of August.

See also

 List of Portuguese dishes

References

Portuguese cuisine